David Scondras (January 5, 1946 – October 21, 2020) was a member of the Boston City Council, having held the District 8 seat from 1984 through 1993. He was one of a few members of the Democratic Socialists of America to be elected to public office.

Political career
Scondras ran unsuccessfully for City Council in 1981, the last election when all seats were at-large. He ran successfully in November 1983, winning the seat for District 8 (Back Bay, Beacon Hill, Mission Hill, and Fenway–Kenmore) and becoming the first openly gay Boston City Council member. in 1985, Scondras spoke out in support of David Jean and Donald Babets, whose foster children were taken from them because they were gay. He was re-elected to four two-year terms, before being defeated in the November 1993 election by Thomas M. Keane Jr. by just 27 votes (3,649–3,622). Leading up to that election, Scondras failed to receive the endorsement of Boston's LGBT-oriented newspaper, Bay Windows, who wrote that he was "out of step with the changing gay community."

Personal life
Scondras was born in 1946 in Lowell, Massachusetts, and graduated from Lowell High School. He received a bachelor's degree in mathematics from Harvard University in 1968, a master's degree in economics from Northeastern University in 1974, and was an instructor in those topics at Northeastern from 1968 through 1987. In 1987, he founded a non-profit organization, Search For A Cure, focused on the development of HIV therapies. He was the author of a four-book autobiography titled Angels, Liars, and Thieves, released from 2015 through 2017.

In 2007, Scondras pleaded guilty to child enticement, stemming from a 2006 event in Lawrence, Massachusetts. He was sentenced to 18 months’ probation, ordered to surrender his computer and register as a sex offender, and stay off the Internet and away from children younger than 16. Scondras later sued the city of Lawrence, charging them with cruel and unusual punishment and assault and battery. In his autobiography, Scondras characterized the event as "being beaten and arrested for not having sex with a boy who did not exist." His lawsuit was dismissed in 2011 because it lacked sufficient evidence.

Scondras died in October 2020. He had battled polycystic kidney disease.

Works

See also
 Boston City Council election, 1983
 Boston City Council election, 1985
 Boston City Council election, 1987
 Boston City Council election, 1989
 Boston City Council election, 1991
 List of Democratic Socialists of America who have held office in the United States

References

Further reading

External links
 Scondras election records at ourcampaigns.com
 The Truth About HIV Prevention via YouTube (video discussion by Scondras)

1946 births
2020 deaths
Place of death missing
20th century in Boston
20th-century American politicians
Boston City Council members
Gay politicians
Harvard College alumni
Northeastern University alumni
Democratic Socialists of America politicians from Massachusetts
Massachusetts socialists
Politicians from Lowell, Massachusetts
Writers from Lowell, Massachusetts
Politicians from Cambridge, Massachusetts
Massachusetts politicians convicted of crimes
American politicians convicted of sex offences
21st-century LGBT people